Košarkaški klub Split, commonly referred to as KK Split or simply Split, is a men's professional basketball club based in Split, Croatia. The club competes in the ABA League and the Croatian League.

History 
The club's roots are found in Hajduk sports society's basketball section, which was established in 1945. After three years of mostly sporadic activity, in 1948, the club established its own organizational structure known as KK Hajduk, which was independent of sports society. In the next year, 1949, the club changed its name to KK Split.

After competing in the Yugoslav lower divisions for more than a decade, the club finally made it to the Yugoslav top-tier level Yugoslav First Federal League, for the 1963–64 season, and it stayed there until the breakup of Yugoslavia.

In 1967, the club adopted–for sponsorship reasons–the name Jugoplastika (Jugoplastika was a factory of clothing, accessories, and footwear products, made from thermoplastic materials and fiberglass; the original predecessor of AD Plastik), and kept it until the end of the 1989–90 season. In the next season, the club participated in the worldwide, national domestic, and European competitions, under the sponsorship of POP 84 (an Italian clothes company from Ancona).

KK Split is among the most successful clubs in European basketball history. They are, together with the first champions of the competition, Rīgas ASK, the only team to win the EuroLeague trophy three times in a row. In the years 1989, 1990, and 1991, the team, which was known back then as Jugoplastika and POP 84, with players like Dino Rađa, Toni Kukoč, Žan Tabak, Velimir Perasović and Zoran Savić, won the European top-tier level basketball trophy.

Apart from these successes, the club also reached the FIBA European Champions Cup final in 1972, and the FIBA European Cup Winners' Cup final in 1973. It lost both finals against the 1970s Italian League superpower Ignis Varese, and the Soviet Union League club Spartak Leningrad. KK Split also won back-to-back Korać Cup titles in 1976, against Chinamartini Torino, and in 1977, against Alco Bologna.

Players

Current roster

FIBA Hall of Famers

Honours 

Total titles: 24

Domestic competitions
 Croatian League
 Winners (1): 2002–03
 Runners-up (6): 1992–93, 1993–94, 1995–96, 1996–97, 2000–01, 2007–08, 2020-21
 Croatian Cup
 Winners (5): 1991–92, 1992–93, 1993–94, 1996–97, 2003–04
 Runners-up (3): 1995–96, 1998–99, 2020–21 
 Yugoslav League (defunct)
 Winners (6): 1970–71, 1976–77, 1987–88, 1988–89, 1989–90, 1990–91
 Runners-up (6): 1971–72, 1973–74, 1974–75, 1975–76, 1978–79, 1979–80
 Yugoslav Cup (defunct)
 Winners (5): 1971–72, 1973–74, 1976–77, 1989–90, 1990–91
 Runners-up (5): 1969–70, 1974–75, 1984–85, 1987–88, 1988–89
 Yugoslav League 1. B (defunct)
 Winners (1): 1981–82

European competitions

 EuroLeague
 Winners (3): 1988–89, 1989–90, 1990–91
 Runners-up (1): 1971–72
 Final Four (3): 1989, 1990, 1991
 FIBA Saporta Cup (defunct)
 Runners-up (1): 1972–73
 Semifinalists (1): 1974–75
 FIBA Korać Cup (defunct)
 Winners (2): 1975–76, 1976–77
 Semifinalists (3): 1973–74, 1978–79, 1979–80
 European Basketball Club Super Cup (semi-official, defunct)
 Winners (1): 1990
 Runners-up (2): 1988, 1989
 4th place (1): 1991

Worldwide competitions
 FIBA Intercontinental Cup
 4th place (1): 1973
 McDonald's Championship
 Runners-up (2): 1989, 1990
 4th place (1): 1991

Other competitions
 FIBA International Christmas Tournament (defunct)
 Winners (1): 1989
 Runners-up (1): 1990

Individual club awards
 Triple Crown
 Winners (2): 1989–90, 1990–91
 Small Triple Crown
 Winners (1): 1976–77

Top performances in European competitions

The road to the European Cup victories 

1975–76 FIBA Korać Cup

1976–77 FIBA Korać Cup
{| class="wikitable" style="text-align: left; font-size:95%"
|- bgcolor="#ccccff"
! Round
! Team
! Home
!   Away  
|-
|2nd
|colspan=3|Bye (as title holder)
|-
|rowspan=2|Top 12
| Standard Liège
| style="text-align:center;"|88–84
| style="text-align:center;"|91–75
|-
| Canon Venezia
| style="text-align:center;"|102–88
| style="text-align:center;"|95–66
|-
|SF
| IBP Stella Azzurra
| style="text-align:center;"|96–71
| style="text-align:center;"|76–87
|-
|F
| Alco Bologna
|colspan=2 align="center"|87–84
|}1988–89 FIBA European Champions Cup1989–90 FIBA European Champions Cup1990–91 FIBA European Champions Cup'''

One of the greatest dynasties in European-wide basketball club competition history, came between 1989 and 1991, when Split simply dominated the FIBA European Champions Cup (EuroLeague) like no other team had in decades. Head coach Božidar Maljković, put together arguably one of the most talented young teams ever seen anywhere: featuring Toni Kukoč, Dino Rađa, Žan Tabak, Velimir Perasović, Zoran Sretenović, and Luka Pavićević, who joined forces with veterans like Duško Ivanović. In 1989, Jugoplastika reached the Final Four, along with heavy favorites FC Barcelona, Maccabi Tel Aviv, and the very competitive Aris. Kukoč had 24 points and Ivanović had 21, to lead Split past FC Barcelona, by a score of 89–77, in the semifinals. Once in the final, Jugoplastika edged Maccabi 75–69, behind 20 points from Rađa, and 18 from an unstoppable Kukoč, whose combination of size, speed, and incredible court vision, turned him into a one-of-a-kind player.

Jugoplastika met FC Barcelona again, in the 1990 FIBA European Champions Cup Final Four, in Zaragoza, Spain. FC Barcelona was backed by thousands of fans, and managed to get a brief 61–59 lead, late in the second half, but Kukoč buried a couple of critical three-pointers, that sent Jugoplastika on its way to its second straight title. Kukoč finished the game with 20 points, and the EuroLeague Final Four MVP award, in his magic hands.

In most places, one can find that the European champions in 1991, were called POP 84, but that was just the name of the sponsor under which the talented players of KK Split were playing that season. Despite being without Dino Rađa and Duško Ivanović, the team from Split was led by a great Toni Kukoč, and a genius-like Zoran Savić, to their third consecutive title. Since the time when Rīgas ASK of the USSR League, won three straight European titles, in 1958, 1959, and 1960, no other team had won three in a row. And in the Final Four era, only two other teams besides Jugoplastika have been able to win even two consecutively (Maccabi Tel Aviv in 2004 and 2005, and Olympiacos in 2012, and 2013).

In 1991, the competition provided some big surprises, leading up to the Final Four at Paris. English club Kingston Kings of the British Basketball League, eliminated CSKA Moscow, and what is more, with a double victory, 93–77 at home and 72–74 in Moscow. German club Bayer 04 Leverkusen of the Basketball Bundesliga, made its debut in the third round, but the other faces were well known to everyone: FC Barcelona Banca Catalana ended first in that phase (11–3), POP 84 was second (9–5), and the other two Final Four teams would be Scavolini Pesaro and Maccabi Tel Aviv, tied at 8–6. Once again, the first team of the previous round did not get the title. In a rematch of the previous year's final – an occurrence that has not been repeated since – the team from Split won 70–65, almost identical to the 1990 score (72–67). Thanks to a great performance by Savić, who scored 27 points, Jugoplastika had an historic three–peat.

Seasons in Yugoslavia 
Split participated in the Yugoslav First Basketball League from the 1964 season, until the breakup of Yugoslavia, in summer of 1991 (except for 1981–82 season, when the club was relegated to the 2nd-tier level Yugoslav 1. B Federal Basketball League).

Notable players 

 Branko Radović
 Ratomir Tvrdić
 Josip Vranković
 Roko Leni Ukić
 Nikola Vujčić
 Dino Rađa
 Damir Šolman
 Duje Krstulović
 Toni Kukoč
 Velimir Perasović
 Zoran Čutura
 Petar Skansi
 Ivica Dukan
 Željko Jerkov
 Damjan Rudež
 Žan Tabak
 Ivica Burić
 Aramis Naglić
 Luka Babić
 Andrija Žižić
 Nikola Prkačin
 Ermal Kuqo
 Krešimir Lončar
 Franjo Arapović
 Damir Rančić
 Teo Čizmić
 Franko Kaštropil
 Srđan Subotić
 Ante Grgurević
 Ante Toni Žižić
 Dragan Bender
 Ante Delaš
 Mario Delaš
 Josip Sobin
 Ivan Siriščević
 Bruno Šundov
 Toni Dijan
 Filip Krušlin
 Hrvoje Perić
 Petar Naumoski
 Luka Pavićević
 Duško Ivanović
 Marlon Garnett
 Larry Ayuso
 Jurij Zdovc
 Peter Vilfan
 Zoran Sretenović
 Zoran Savić
 Terrence Rencher
 Steve Colter
 Ray "Sugar" Richardson
 Avie Lester
 Jamon Gordon
 Damir Mršić
 Andrija Stipanović
 Dejan Ivanov

Players at the NBA draft

Head coaches 

 Enzo Sovitti
 Branko Radović
 Srđan Kalember
 Petar Skansi
 Matan Rimac
 Zoran Grašo
 Krešimir Ćosić
 Zoran Slavnić
 Božidar Maljković
 Željko Pavličević
  Slobodan Subotić
 Josip "Pino" Grdović
 Predrag Kruščić

References

External links 
Official website of KK Split 
KK Split at Eurobasket.com

 
Split
Sport in Split, Croatia
Split
Basketball teams in Yugoslavia